ACBC may refer to:

 Asian Carom Billiard Confederation
 Athletic Club of BC
 Atlantic City–Brigantine Connector
 Australia China Business Council
 Australian Catholic Bishops' Conference
 Australian Corporate Bond Company